Cryptothylax is a small genus of hyperoliid frogs found in the Congo Basin.

Species
There are two species in this genus:
 Cryptothylax greshoffii (Schilthuis, 1889)
 Cryptothylax minutus Laurent, 1976

References

 
Hyperoliidae
Amphibians of Africa
Amphibian genera
Taxa named by Raymond Laurent